Mohan Parmar ( b. 15 March 1948) is a Gujarati language short story writer, novelist and critic. Parmar won the Sahitya Akademi Award for Gujarati in 2011 for his short story collection Anchalo. He was earlier editor of Hayati, an organ of Gujarati Dalit Sahitya Akademi, along with Harish Mangalam. He served as deputy editor of Parab, a monthly journal of Gujarati Sahitya Parishad.

Early life 
Parmar was born in Bhasariya, a village in Mahesana district of Gujarat, India to Ambalal and Manchhiben. He completed his primary education from Bhasariya Primary School, and took his secondary education at Linch and Aambaliyasan villages, earning his S.S.C. in 1966. He completed his B.A. in 1982 from Mahesana college with Gujarati literature. He completed M.A. in 1984 as an external student from Gujarat University, earning a Ph.D. in 1994 under Chandrakant Topiwala. His doctoral thesis was The Distinguishable Dimensions of Short Story after Suresh Joshi.

Works 
Kolahal, his first short story collection, was published in 1980, followed by Vaayak (1995) and Anchalo (2008). His novels include Bhekhad (1982), Vikriya, Kaalgrasta, Prapti (1990), Neliyu (1992), and Luptavedh (2006). His critical works are published as Sanvitti (1984), Ansaar (1989), and Vartarohan (2005). His research work Suresh Joshi Pachhini Vartana Vishesh Parinamo was published in 2001.

He edited Jyotish Janini Vartasrishti (2013), a collection of selected stories of Jyotish Jani.

Recognition 
He won the Sahitya Akademi Award of 2011 for his short story collection Anchalo (2008). He received the Uma-Snehrashmi Prize (2000–01), Sant Kabir Award (2003) and Premanand Suvarna Chandrak (2011).

Personal life 
Parmar is a retired administrative officer of Gujarat Maritime Board, Gandhinagar.

See also 

 List of Gujarati-language writers

References

Modernist writers
Indian literary critics
1948 births
Living people
Indian male short story writers
Gujarati-language writers
People from Mehsana district
Recipients of the Sahitya Akademi Award in Gujarati
Indian male novelists